This is a List of notable Hindi language poets:

A
 Abdul Rahim Khan-I-Khana (1556–1627), composer, poet, and produced books on astrology
 Amir Khusrow (1253–1325), musician, scholar and poet
 Ashok Chakradhar (born 1951), author and poet
 Atal Bihari Vajpai (1924–2018), author, poet and orator

B
 Banarsidas (1586–1643), poet, businessman
 Bihari (1595–1663), poet, author
 Bhikhari Das (1721–?), poet
 Bharatendu Harishchandra (1850–1885), novelist, poet, playwright
 Bhawani Prasad Mishra (1913–1985), poet and author

C 
 Choudhari Mulkiram (1910–1954) poet, philosopher and writer

D
 Dharmveer Bharti (1926–1997), poet, author, playwright and a social thinker
 Dushyant Kumar (1933–1975), poet of modern Hindustani

G
 Geet Chaturvedi (born 1977), poet, short story author and journalist
 Gopal Singh Nepali (1911–1963), poet of Hindi literature and lyricist of Bollywood
 Gopal Prasad Vyas (1915–2005), poet, known for his humorous poems
 Gopaldas Neeraj (born 1924), poet and author
 Gulab Khandelwal (born 1924), poetry including some in Urdu and English
 Gulzar (born 1934), poet, lyricist, film director

H
 Harivansh Rai Bachchan (1907–2003), poet of Chhayavaad literary movement (romantic upsurge)
 Hemant Shesh (born 1952), writer, poet and civil servant
 Hith Harivansh Mahaprabhu (1502–1552), Braj Bhasha poet-sant and bhakti religious leader

I
 Indra Bahadur Khare (1922–1953), Chhayavaad writer and poet

J
 Jagdish Gupt (1924–2001), Chhayavaad literary movement poet
 Jaishankar Prasad (1889–1937), novelist, playwright, poet
 Javed Akhtar (born 1945), poet, lyricist and scriptwriter
 Jwalamukhi (1938–2008), poet, novelist, writer and political activist

K
 Kabir (1440–1518), mystic poet and saint of India
 Kailash Vajpeyi (1936–2015)
 Kavi Bhushan (1613–1712), poet and scholar
 Kaka Hathrasi (1906–1995), satirist and humorist poet
 Kedarnath Agarwal (1911–2000), Hindi language poet and littérateur
 Kedarnath Singh (1934–2018), poet, critic and essayist
 Keshavdas (1555–1617), Sanskrit scholar and Hindi poet
 Kripalu Maharaj (1922–2013), spiritual master (Jagadguru) and a poet-saint
 Krishan Kumar Sharma "Rasik" (born 1983), Hindi, Punjabi, English and Urdu poet and writer
 Kumar Vishwas (born 1970), poet and professor
 Kunwar Bechain (1942–2021), professor and poet
 Kunwar Narayan (1927–2017), poet

L
 Laxminarayan Payodhi (born 1957), poet and researcher

M
 Mahadevi Varma (1906–1987), poet, freedom fighter, woman's activist and educationist
 Maithili Sharan Gupt (1886–1964), poet, politician, dramatist, translator
 Makhanlal Chaturvedi (1889–1968), Indian poet, writer, essayist, playwright and a journalist
 Meera (1498–1547), mystic singer and composer of Bhajans
 Mohan Rana (born 1964), poet
 Murari Lal Sharma Neeras (born 1936), poet and educator

N
 Nagarjun (1911–1998), poet, writer, essayist, novelist
 Naresh Mehta, poet and playwright
 Narottam Das (1550–1605), the writer of 'Sudama Charitra' and contemporary of Tulsidas
 Nathuram SharmaShankar (1859–1932), Hindi poet
 Nawal Kishore Dhawal (1911–1964), writer, poet, proof reader, editor, critic, journalist and author

O
 Om Prakash Aditya (1936–2009), poet

P

 Pawan Karan (born 1964), poet, writer, editor, journalist, columnist, social and political analyst
 Phoolchand Gupta (born 1958), poet, writer and translator
 Prabha Kiran Jain, poet and writer
 Prasoon Joshi, advertiser, lyricist, and poet

R
 Rambhadracharya (born 1950), religious leader and educationist.
 Ramdhari Singh Dinkar (1908–1974), poet, essayist and academic
 Ram Ratan Bhatnagar (born 1914), scholar, professor, writer and critic of poetry and literature
 Rustam Singh (born 1955), poet, philosopher, translator and editor
 Ravindra Prabhat (born 1969), writer, poet, editor, critic, journalist and author

S
 Sachchidananda Vatsyayan (1911–1987), poet, writer, novelist, journalist, traveler
 Shivmangal Singh Suman (1915–2002), poet and academician
 Shail Chaturvedi (1936–2007), poet, humorist, lyricist, actor
 Shankardas Kesarilal Shailendra (1923–1966), poet, lyricist; known for his poetry used in Hindi cinema

 Sri Lal Sukla, author, writer
 Subhadra Kumari Chauhan (1904–1948), poet known for her emotionally charged songs
 Sudama Panday 'Dhoomil' (1936–1975), poet known for his revolutionary writings and protest-poetry
 Surdas (1467–1583), composer and devotional poet
 Sūdan (1700–1753), poet
 Sumitranandan Pant (1900–1975), Chhayavaad poetry, verse plays and essays
 Suryakant Tripathi 'Nirala' (1899–1961), poet, novelist, essayist and story-writer
 Suryakumar Pandey (born 1954), poet, writer

T
 Tara Singh, poet
 Teji Grover (born 1955), poet, fiction writer, translator and painter
 Tulsidas (1497/1532–1623), poet-saint, reformer and philosopher

U
 Uday Prakash (born 1952), scholar, poet, journalist, translator and short story writer

V
 Vishnu Khare (1940–2018), Hindi journalist, translator and poet
 Vrind (1643–1723), Braj bhasha poet

See also
List of Hindi-language authors
List of Indian poets
List of Indian writers

References

Lists of poets by language
 
Hindi poets
Poets